Antônio Ferreira (10 August 1942 – 26 January 1990), usually known as Toninho Guerreiro, was a Brazilian footballer.

He played for Santos FC with Pelé as a forward in the 1960s scoring 283 goals in 373 games (.758 goals per game) scoring more goals than Pelé in 66 (60 goals) and 68 (75 goals). He is Santos FC's fourth-highest scorer of all time. He won Copa Libertadores and World Club Cup in 1963.

He also played for São Paulo FC in the 1970s where he won the Paulista Championship twice being their top scorer. In 1976, he played abroad in the National Soccer League with Montreal Castors.

Many say he should have gone to the 1970 FIFA World Cup and was on João Saldanha's list. In the end, Dadá Maravilha took his place and the rumour is that he made it because of Brazil President's wish. He played only once for Brazil scoring a single goal.

Honours 
Santos
 Intercontinental Cup: 1963
 Copa Libertadores: 1963
 Campeonato Brasileiro Série A: 1964,  1965, 1968
 Torneio Rio-São Paulo: 1963, 1964, 1966
 Campeonato Paulista: 1964, 1965, 1967, 1968, 1969

São Paulo
 Campeonato Paulista: 1970, 1971

References

 
 Bigsoccer

1942 births
1990 deaths
People from Bauru
Brazilian footballers
Brazilian expatriate footballers
Association football forwards
Campeonato Brasileiro Série A players
Brazil international footballers
Esporte Clube Noroeste players
Santos FC players
São Paulo FC players
CR Flamengo footballers
Copa Libertadores-winning players
Operário Futebol Clube (MS) players
Montreal Castors players
Canadian National Soccer League players
Brazilian expatriate sportspeople in Canada
Expatriate soccer players in Canada
Footballers from São Paulo (state)